Inner Asia refers to the northern and landlocked regions spanning North, Central and East Asia. It includes parts of western and northeast China, as well as southern Siberia. The area overlaps with some definitions of 'Central Asia', mostly the historical ones, but certain regions that are often included in Inner Asia, such as Manchuria, are not a part of Central Asia by any of its definitions. Inner Asia may be regarded as the western and northern "frontier" of China proper of the former Qin dynasty and as being bounded by East Asia proper, which consists of China, Japan and Korea.

The extent of Inner Asia has been understood differently in different periods. "Inner Asia" is sometimes contrasted to "China Proper", that is, the original provinces, those with majority Han Chinese populations. In 1800, Inner Asia consisted of four main areas, namely Manchuria (modern Northeast China and Outer Manchuria), Mongolia (Inner and Outer), Xinjiang (East Turkestan), and Tibet. These areas had been only recently conquered by the Qing dynasty of China and, during most of the Qing period, they were governed through administrative structures different from those of the older Chinese provinces. A Qing government agency, the Lifan Yuan, supervised the empire's Inner Asian regions.

Definition and usage

"Inner Asia" today has a range of definitions and usages. Denis Sinor, for example, used "Inner Asia" in contrast to agricultural civilizations, noting its changing borders, such as when a Roman province was taken by the Huns, areas of North China were occupied by the Mongols, or Anatolia came under Turkish influence, eradicating Hellenistic culture.

Scholars or historians of the Qing dynasty, such as those who compiled the New Qing History, often use the term "Inner Asia" when studying Qing interests or reigns outside China proper.

In other languages
In French, "Asie centrale" can mean either "Central Asia" or "Inner Asia", while Mongolia and Tibet are grouped as "Haute-Asie" (Upper Asia).

The terms meaning "Inner Asia" in the languages of Inner Asia itself are all modern translations of terms in European languages, mostly Russian.

Related terms

Central Asia

"Central Asia" normally denotes the western, Islamic part of Inner Asia; that is, Kazakhstan, Kyrgyzstan, Tajikistan, Turkmenistan, and Uzbekistan, with Afghanistan and Iran sometimes also included as part of Central Asia. However, The Library of Congress subject classification system treats "Central Asia" and Inner Asia as synonymous.

Central Eurasia
According to Morris Rossabi, the term "Inner Asia" is the well-established term for the area in the literature. However, because of its deficiencies, including the implication of an "Outer Asia" that does not exist, Denis Sinor has proposed the neologism "Central Eurasia", which emphasizes the role of the area in intercontinental exchange. According to Sinor:

The definition that can be given of Central Eurasia in space is negative. It is that part of the continent of Eurasia that lies beyond the borders of the great sedentary civilizations.... Although the area of Central Eurasia is subject to fluctuations, the general trend is that of diminution. With the territorial growth of the sedentary civilizations, their borderline extends and offers a larger surface on which new layers of barbarians will be deposited.

See also

China proper
Chinese Tartary
Western Regions
Tang dynasty in Inner Asia
Yuan dynasty in Inner Asia
Qing dynasty in Inner Asia
Nomadic empire
Eurasianism
Pan-Mongolism
Silk Road
Turco-Mongols
Turkification
Turan
Turanism
Tartary
Division of the Mongol Empire
History of Manchuria
History of Mongolia
History of Tibet
History of Xinjiang

References

Citations

Sources 

 Di Cosmo, Nicola. 1999. "State Formation and Periodization in Inner Asian History". Journal of World History 10 (1). University of Hawai'i Press: 1–40. State Formation and Periodization in Inner Asian History.
 Rogers, J. Daniel. 2012. "Inner Asian States and Empires: Theories and Synthesis". Journal of Archaeological Research 20 (3). Springer: 205–56. Inner Asian States and Empires: Theories and Synthesis.

External links 
The Association for Asian Studies (AAS): The China and Inner Asia Council (CIAC).
Indiana University at Bloomington: Research Institute for Inner Asian Studies (RIFIAS). 
University of Cambridge: Mongolia and Inner Asia Studies Unit (MIASU).

 
Regions of Asia
Natural history of Asia
Historical regions